Gao Min, (born 26 January 1982 in Hebei) is a Chinese road racing cyclist. She finished 16th in the Women's road race at the 2008 Summer Olympics.

Palmarès

2002
3rd National Road Race Champions Tournament
2003
2nd National Road Race Champions Tournament
2007
2nd World B Class Road Race Championships
2008
1st Asian Road Race Championships
16th Road race, 2008 Summer Olympics
17th Road time trial, 2008 Summer Olympics

References

External links
 Profile Beijing 2008 Team China

1982 births
Living people
Cyclists at the 2008 Summer Olympics
Olympic cyclists of China
Cyclists from Hebei
Cyclists at the 2010 Asian Games
Chinese female cyclists
Asian Games competitors for China
21st-century Chinese women